Dayton's Devils is a 1968 crime film starring Rory Calhoun and Leslie Nielsen. It marked the film debut of Lainie Kazan and Rigg Kennedy.

Plot
Frank Dayton (Leslie Nielsen) leads a group of crooks in a caper to steal $2,500,000 from an Air Force base. Dayton is the tough-guy military leader who recruits Mike (Rory Calhoun), ex-Nazi Max (Hans Gudegast), sadistic killer Barney Barry (Barry Sadler), and failed French artist Claude (Pat Renella) in the scheme. Singer Lainie Kazan plays the romantic interest for Dayton as the nightclub songbird Leda.

Actor Hans Gudegast, known at the time from TV war series "The Rat Patrol," later changed his name to Eric Braeden, becoming a soap opera star in "The Young and the Restless."  Barry Sadler, as Sgt. Barry Sadler, had a top 40 hit record with "Ballad of the Green Berets."

Cast
 Rory Calhoun as Mike Page
 Leslie Nielsen as Frank Dayton
 Lainie Kazan as Leda Martell
 Hans Gudegast (later known as Eric Braeden) as Max Eikhart
 Barry Sadler as Barney Barry
 Pat Renella as Claude Sadi
 Georg Stanford Brown as Theon Gibson
 Rigg Kennedy as Sonny Merton
 Mike Farrell as Naval Officer

References

External links
 
 

1968 films
1968 crime drama films
American heist films
1960s English-language films
1960s American films